This is the list of all Everton's European matches. The club's first entry into European competitions was the 1963–64 European Cup, with their most recent being the 2017–18 UEFA Europa League. Their only trophy in European competitions came in the 1985 European Cup Winners' Cup.

European Final
Everton's score listed first

Overall record

Source: uefa.comPld = Matches played; W = Matches won; D = Matches drawn; L = Matches lost; GF = Goals for; GA = Goals against. Defunct competitions indicated in italics.

Matches

By country

UEFA competitions

Non-UEFA competitions

External links

References 

Europe
English football clubs in international competitions